The men's 5000 metre relay in short track speed skating at the 2014 Winter Olympics was held between 13–21 February 2014 at the Iceberg Skating Palace in Sochi, Russia.

The semifinal was held on 13 February with the final on 21 February.

The defending Olympic Champion and World Champion was Canada.

Qualification
Countries were assigned quotas using a combination of the two special Olympic Qualification classifications that were held at two world cups in November 2013. For this event a total of 8 nations qualified to compete.

Results
The final was held at 22:18.

Semifinals
 QA – qualified for Final A
 QB – qualified for Final B
 ADV – advanced
 PEN – penalty

Finals

Final B (Classification Round)

Final A (Medal Round)

References

Men's short track speed skating at the 2014 Winter Olympics